Gary L. Cammack (born June 9, 1953) is an American politician and a Republican member of the South Dakota House of Representatives representing District 29 since January 11, 2013.

Elections

South Dakota House of Representatives
2012 When incumbent Republican Representative Thomas J. Brunner was term limited and left the Legislature and left a District 29 seat open, Cammack ran in the three-way June 5, 2012 Republican Primary and placed first with 1,450 votes (43.8%); Cammack and incumbent Republican Representative Dean Wink were unopposed for the November 6, 2012 General election, where Cammack took the first seat with 5,991 votes (55.40%) and Representative Wink took the second seat.

References

External links
Official page at the South Dakota Legislature
 

1953 births
21st-century American politicians
Living people
Republican Party members of the South Dakota House of Representatives
People from Meade County, South Dakota
Place of birth missing (living people)